The AEGON Ard Schenk Award is a Dutch speedskating award, instated in 1990, named after famous Dutch speedskater Ard Schenk. Initially it was an award for the best speed skater, the marathon included. Since 2002 it is only for long track speed skating. Since 2003, the best skating teams are awarded as well.

The statue is made by Wim Jonker (an artist from Haarlem, Netherlands). The statue is based on an old action photo of Ard Schenk.

Winners

Number of wins

Man

Women

References

Speed skating awards
Awards established in 1990